Anandabhairavi is a 2007 Indian Malayalam-language film by Jayaraj starring Sai Kumar and Devdas. Sai Kumar won the Kerala State Film Award for second best actor for this film. The film tells about the story of a highly talented, but ailing boy, with extraordinary skills in music.

Cast

Plot
Jayaraj's Anandabhairavi depicts the life of Vasudeva Panicker, a Kathakali artist, and his son. Sai Kumar plays the role of Panikker and Master Devan is his son Appu. Sai Kumar won the Kerala State Film Award for the second best actor, for his performance in this movie. Storyline is prepared jointly by Mahesh and Sajeev. Madambu Kunjukkuttan scripted the movie. The music is by Parthasarathi. Harinath cranked the camera.

Soundtrack

References

External links
 
 https://web.archive.org/web/20100717075842/http://www.whataboutu.com/list_Anandabhairavi~19118.html

2007 films
2000s Malayalam-language films
2000s musical films
Indian musical films